The Malaysia Pahang Sports School (SSMP) or Sekolah Sukan Malaysia Pahang represents Malaysia in under-15 and under-16 tournaments. It is controlled by the Football Association of Malaysia. The school is located at the Gambang compound in Kuantan, Pahang. In 2014, SSMP competing in Malaysian President's Cup. In 2015 SSMP will compete in Malaysia Youth League or U19 League.

Honours

International records

Asian Confederation

AFC U-16 Championship

ASEAN Confederation

AFF U17 Youth Championship

AFF U-16 Youth Championship

Invited tournament

AIFF Youth Cup

Domestic

Results and fixtures

2016

Players

AMD COUGARS squad

Coaching staffs

References

External links 
 
 

Malaysia national football team
Football clubs in Malaysia
Under-17 association football
Football academies in Malaysia
Sport in Pahang
Sport schools in Malaysia
Secondary schools in Malaysia
Publicly funded schools in Malaysia